Love Birds is a 1934 American pre-Code comedy film directed by William A. Seiter and written by Doris Anderson, Henry Myers, and Tom Reed. The film stars Slim Summerville, ZaSu Pitts, Mickey Rooney, Frederick Burton, Emmett Vogan, and Dorothy Christy. The film was released on May 4, 1934, by Universal Pictures.

Plot

Cast       
Slim Summerville as Henry Whipple
ZaSu Pitts as Araminta Tootle
Mickey Rooney as Gladwyn Tootle
Frederick Burton as Barbwire
Emmett Vogan as Forbes
Dorothy Christy as Kitten
Maude Eburne as Mme. Bertha
Ethel Mandell as Teacher
John T. Murray as Dentist
Craig Reynolds as Bus Driver
Gertrude Short as Burlesque Girl
Arthur Stone as Janitor
Clarence Wilson as Blewitt

References

External links
 

1934 films
1930s English-language films
American comedy films
1934 comedy films
Universal Pictures films
Films directed by William A. Seiter
Films scored by Heinz Roemheld
American black-and-white films
1930s American films